The 2023 Bauchi State gubernatorial election will take place on 18 March 2023, to elect the Governor of Bauchi State, concurrent with elections to the Bauchi State House of Assembly as well as twenty-seven other gubernatorial elections and elections to all other state houses of assembly. The election—which was postponed from its original 11 March date—will be held three weeks after the presidential election and National Assembly elections. Incumbent PDP Governor Bala Mohammed initially declined to run for re-election, instead running for president. However, after losing the PDP presidential primary in May 2022, Mohammed was renominated in a rerun primary.

Party primaries were scheduled for between 4 April and 9 June 2022 with the Peoples Democratic Party nominating former Secretary to the State Government Ibrahim Kashim on 25 May while the All Progressives Congress nominated former Chief of the Air Staff Sadique Abubakar on 26 May. However, Kashim withdrew from the nomination on 30 May after Mohammed lost the PDP presidential primary; on 4 June, Mohammed won a rerun primary unopposed. On 4 August, Senator Halliru Dauda Jika—who came second in the APC primary—won the primary of the smaller New Nigeria Peoples Party after he defected from the APC two months prior.

Electoral system
The Governor of Bauchi State is elected using a modified two-round system. To be elected in the first round, a candidate must receive the plurality of the vote and over 25% of the vote in at least two-thirds of state local government areas. If no candidate passes this threshold, a second round will be held between the top candidate and the next candidate to have received a plurality of votes in the highest number of local government areas.

Background
Bauchi State is a large, diverse northeastern state with a growing economy and vast natural areas but facing an underdeveloped yet vital agricultural sector, desertification, and a rising sexual violence epidemic.

Politically, the state's 2019 elections were a mixed bag for both major parties. In federal elections, Buhari held the state for the APC albeit with a reduced margin of victory while the APC swept all senate seats by winning back two seats it lost due to defections. Both major parties lost seats in House of Representatives elections to the benefit of the minor People's Redemption Party. On the state level, Mohammed unseated APC incumbent Governor Mohammed Abdullahi Abubakar by a narrow margin as the APC held the House of Assembly. During the terms, defections rose the APC's numbers in the federal House while increasing PDP numbers in the state assembly, solidifying Bauchi's politically competitive status.

Over the course of Mohammed's term, his administration stated focuses included education, forging a positive business environment, mineral resources, and agriculture development. In terms of his performance, Mohammed was praised for signing a bill to combat violence against women and following through on some campaign promises but was criticized for awarding inflated contracts to a company in which he is a director, buying the state PDP chairman a car with government money, a flawed COVID-19 response, continued corruption investigations from his time as FCT Minister, attacks on press freedoms, and his brief early 2021 spat with Benue State Governor Samuel Ortom which descended into ethnic gibes.

Primary elections
The primaries, along with any potential challenges to primary results, were to take place between 4 April and 3 June 2022 but the deadline was extended to 9 June. In terms of zoning, some candidates and community leaders under the group Zauren Mutanen Bauchi have requested that the governorship be zoned to either the Bauchi North or Central senatorial districts as the last three Bauchi governors have come from the Southern district. However, no major party has yet closed their primaries to candidates from the South.

All Progressives Congress 
Arguments over zoning divided the state APC ahead of the primary as northern politicians publicly advocated for the party nominee to come from the North senatorial district while prospective candidates from other regions argued for the primary to be kept open.

Seven screened candidates participated in the primary, with Chief of the Air Staff Sadique Abubakar winning by a margin of about 9% over first runner-up, Senator Halliru Dauda Jika. In his acceptance speech, Abubakar thanked supportive delegates before calling on his former opponents to work with him for the benefit of the party. However, Halliru Dauda Jika–the first runner-up–left the party for the NNPP a few weeks after the primary and obtained the party's gubernatorial nomination.

Nominated 
 Sadique Abubakar: Ambassador to Chad (2021–present) and former Chief of the Air Staff (2015–2021)
 Running mate—Shehu Aliyu Musa: former House of Representatives member

Eliminated in primary 
 Musa Babayo: former Chairman of the Tertiary Education Trust Fund (2013–2015) and former PDP National Secretary (2012–2015)
 Halliru Dauda Jika: Senator for Bauchi Central (2019–present) and former House of Representatives member for Darazo/Ganjuwa (2007–2019) (defected after the primary to successfully run in the NNPP rerun primary)
 Mahmood Maijama'a: former Secretary to the State Government and former Commissioner of Finance
 Nura Manu Soro: former Commissioner of Finance (2019)
 Farouk Mustapha: 2019 NNPP Bauchi North senatorial nominee and former House of Representatives member for Katagum (2003–2007) (defected after the primary)
 Muhammad Ali Pate: Minister of State for Health (2011–2013)

Withdrew 
 Muhammad Sani Alamin
 Bala Mohammed Jibrin: 2019 APC gubernatorial candidate, former APC National Auditor (2014–2015), and former commissioner
 Yusuf Tuggar: Ambassador to Germany (2017–present), 2015 APC gubernatorial candidate, former House of Representatives member for Gamawa (2007–2011), and 2011 CPC gubernatorial nominee

Declined 
 Yakubu Shehu Abdullahi: House of Representatives member for Bauchi (2019–present) 
 Mohammed Abdullahi Abubakar: former Governor (2015–2019) and former state Attorney-General
 Lawal Yahaya Gumau: Senator for Bauchi South (2018–present) and former House of Representatives member for Toro (2011–2018)
 Adamu Muhammad Bulkachuwa: Senator for Bauchi North (2019–present) and husband of former President of the Nigerian Courts of Appeal Zainab Adamu Bulkachuwa
 Abubakar Maikafi: former Senator for Bauchi South (2003–2007)
 Abdullahi Babani Tela: a Deputy Comptroller General of Customs

Results

People's Democratic Party 
Ahead of the primary, incumbent Governor Mohammed announced that he would run for president. The announcement set into motion an open primary until rumours emerged that Mohammed was still looking to run for governor as a back-up plan. By May, several reports came out with confirmation that Mohammed had purchased a gubernatorial nomination form while concurrently running for president with the intention of having former Secretary to the State Government Ibrahim Kashim win the gubernatorial primary and give Mohammed the nomination if his presidential campaign failed.

On the primary date, Kashim was the sole candidate and won the nomination unopposed. In his acceptance speech, Kashim thanked the party while pledging to continue the work of the Mohammed administration. However, a few days after the gubernatorial primary, Mohammed lost the PDP presidential primary and the plan to substitute him in as the gubernatorial nominee immediately commenced. On 31 May, Kashim withdrew from the nomination, stating "I know right from day one that if the governor didn’t get the PDP presidential ticket, I will definitely step down for him." A few days later, Mohammed reappointed Kashim to his cabinet before winning the rerun primary on 4 June unopposed. 

In August, Muhammad Auwal Jatau—MHR for Zaki—was picked as the deputy gubernatorial nominee instead of incumbent Deputy Governor Baba Tela. Jatau thanked Mohammed for the "great honour."

Nominated 
 Bala Mohammed: Governor (2019–present), Minister of the Federal Capital Territory (2010–2015), and former Senator for Bauchi South (2007–2010)
 Running mate—Muhammad Auwal Jatau: House of Representatives member for Zaki (2020–present)

Withdrew after nomination
 Ibrahim Kashim: former Secretary to the State Government

Withdrew 
 Ahmad Ahmed Mu’azu: son of former Governor Ahmadu Adamu Mu’azu
 Sulaiman Mohammed Nazif: former Senator for Bauchi Central (2007–2011; 2015–2019)

Declined 
 Abdul Ahmed Ningi: 2019 PDP gubernatorial candidate, former Senator for Bauchi Central (2011–2015), and former House of Representatives member for Ningi/Warji (1999–2011)
 Sallau Ahmed Dandija: former Secretary to the State Government

Results

Minor parties 

 Magaji Musa (Action Alliance)
Running mate: Zakka Mutashi Bisu
 Usman Dankyrana Mustapha (Action Democratic Party)
Running mate: Fodi Bashir Usman
 Kabiru Abdulhamid Shuwa (Action Peoples Party)
Running mate: Mahmood Yunusa
 Buhari Adamu Idris (African Action Congress)
Running mate: Hassan Hayatuddeen
 Saleh Auwalu Dahiru (African Democratic Congress)
Running mate: Ibrahim Bappah
 Auwal Isah (Allied Peoples Movement)
Running mate: Nura Muhammad Musa
 Abubakar Ibrahim (Labour Party)
Running mate: Umar Ikilma
 Halliru Dauda Jika (New Nigeria Peoples Party)
Running mate: Dahuwa Mohammed Gadauji
 Saleh Sulaiman (National Rescue Movement)
Running mate: Ahmed Suleiman Isah
 Farouk Ahmed Umar (People's Redemption Party)
Running mate: Sunusi Yusuf Jalam
 Aminu Mohammed (Social Democratic Party)
Running mate: Mohammed Usman
 Khalid Hassan (Zenith Labour Party)
Running mate: Asmau Muhammad Ahmad

Campaign
As the general election campaign began in June 2022, Mohammed began to attack Abubakar by accusing him and one of his wives—Sadiya Umar Farouq, the serving Minister of Humanitarian Affairs, Disaster Management & Social Development—of stealing public funds to finance his campaign. Abubakar and the APC looked elsewhere as the party dealt with the aftermath of several prominent defections with Senators Halliru Dauda Jika and Lawal Yahaya Gumau joining the NNPP; Jika became the NNPP gubernatorial nominee as well. Pundits identified numerous potential factors for the general election, namely: regional identity—Abubakar is from Bauchi North district which has produced no governors in over 20 years, Jika's candidacy, the power of Mohammed's incumbency, the defections from the APC, and "federal might" in favor of the APC. For each major contender, OrderPaper Nigeria noted strengths and weaknesses with Mohammed being helped by his administration's infrastructural development but hurt by nepotism allegations; Jika being aided by the pre-existing Kwankwasiyya NNPP structure in the state but hurt by regionalism and zoning favoring the northern district; and Abubakar being helped by his military service but hurt by his lack of political experience and APC infighting. By September, multiple reports had classified Jika as a major candidate while the Daily Trust focused on the difficulties incumbent Bauchi governors have faced in their re-election bids. In the same month, Abubakar was embroiled in controversy as he was accused of falsifying his certificates.

In November, a new dynamic entered the race due to the simmering feud between Mohammed and PDP presidential nominee Atiku Abubakar (along with former Governor Ahmadu Adamu Mu’azu and former Senator Abdul Ahmed Ningi). Analysis from The Nation noted the PDP divides as a potentially major factor in the election in addition to regional and religious factors. Conversely, the APC faced division as former Governor Mohammed Abdullahi Abubakar backed Mohammed over Abubakar in December 2022. As the election neared in February 2023, review of the race's regional factors noted the importance of the highly competitive, vote-heavy Bauchi South Senatorial District amid the PDP crisis in the area; the likelihood that Abubakar would win the Bauchi North Senatorial District due to its large number of prominent APC stalwarts; and the likelihood that Mohammed would win the Bauchi Central Senatorial District as Jika is expected to split the anti-PDP vote.

Later in February, focus switched to the presidential election on 25 February. In the election, Bauchi State voted for Atiku Abubakar (PDP); Abubakar won the state with 50.0% of the vote, beating Bola Tinubu (APC) at 37.1% and Rabiu Kwankwaso (NNPP) at 8.5%. Despite the presidential result, gubernatorial election analysis reiterated the race's competitiveness along with continued fights between Mohammed and other PDP figures. Nonetheless, the EiE-SBM forecast projected Mohammed to win based on "how the presidential elections played out."

Projections

Conduct

Electoral timetable

General election

Results

By senatorial district 
The results of the election by senatorial district.

By federal constituency
The results of the election by federal constituency.

By local government area 
The results of the election by local government area.

See also 
 2023 Nigerian elections
 2023 Nigerian gubernatorial elections

Notes

References 

Bauchi State gubernatorial election
2023
2023 Bauchi State elections
Bauchi